Tribe of Force is the third album by German acapella metal band Van Canto.The album was released on 1 March 2010. This is the band's first release with Napalm Records.

The track listing features 13 tracks, two of them being covers ("Master of Puppets" by Metallica and "Rebellion" by Grave Digger), and three of them featuring guest artists: Victor Smolski (from Rage) guest appears in "One To Ten", Tony Kakko (from Sonata Arctica) guest appears on "Hearted" and Chris Boltendahl (from Grave Digger) guest appears in "Rebellion".

Two of this album's songs ("Water, Fire, Heaven, Earth" & "Hearted") have been, among Within Temptation's "Our Farewell", the inspiration for "Forevermore", a song by the Dutch symphonic metal band EPICA, featuring the mild-autistic Ruurd Woltring. The recording of this song was made possible thanks to the Dutch TV-show "Niks te gek!" (Nothing too crazy), in which mentally disabled people get their wishes granted.

Track listing

Personnel 
Band members
Dennis Schunke (Sly) – lead vocals
Inga Scharf – lead vocals (effects)
Stefan Schmidt – lower rakkatakka vocals, wahwah solo guitar vocals (rhythm, lead on solos)
Ross Thompson – higher rakkatakka vocals (lead)
Ingo Sterzinger (Ike) – lowest dandan vocals (bass)
Bastian Emig – drums
Guest musicians
Victor Smolski (Rage) - guitar solo on "One to Ten"
Chris Boltendahl (Grave Digger) - vocals on Rebellion
Orchestra on "Magic Taborea"
Tony Kakko (Sonata Arctica) - vocals on "Hearted"

References 

2010 albums
Napalm Records albums
Van Canto albums
Albums produced by Charlie Bauerfeind